Berkeley station was the name of an Atchison, Topeka and Santa Fe Railway (ATSF) railroad station in Berkeley, California from 1904 to the 1950s. It is located on University Avenue between Acton and Chestnut Streets. The station building is today occupied by The Berkeley School.

The station opened in May 1904 as the ATSF was extended from its previous terminus in Richmond to a new end of the line in Oakland over the former California and Nevada Railroad. After passenger operations ceased in the 1950s, the station was used as a bus depot until those services were discontinued the following decade. The city of Berkeley acquired the railroad's right of way through city limits in 1978, but the Berkeley depot was retained by ATSF. The station building was then converted to a restaurant, and functioned in that capacity until 2000. In 2001, it was purchased by the Berkeley Montessori School and redeveloped into a private school. That same year, the building was designated a City of Berkeley Landmark. While the adjacent railbed was removed soon after the city's purchase, the replacement linear park and rail trail did not open until 2013.

References

Railway stations in the United States opened in 1904
1904 establishments in California
Railway stations in Alameda County, California
History of the San Francisco Bay Area
Former Atchison, Topeka and Santa Fe Railway stations in California
Repurposed railway stations in the United States
Buildings and structures in Berkeley, California